The 2001 Cupa României Final was the 63rd final of Romania's most prestigious cup competition. The final was played at the Stadionul Naţional in Bucharest on 16 June 2001 and was contested between Divizia A sides Dinamo București and Rocar București. The cup was won by Dinamo.

Route to the final

Match details

References

External links
 Official site 

Cupa Romaniei Final, 2001
2000-01
2001